Yinchuan Helanshan Airport is an airport in Yinchuan, Ningxia, China. The airport is mostly a military field.

See also
List of airports in the People's Republic of China

References 

Airports in Ningxia
Yinchuan